Pietro Ciotti (born 31 July 1999) is an Italian professional footballer who plays as a right back for  club Fidelis Andria.

Career
Born in Nocera Inferiore, Ciotti started his career in Nocerina youth sector. In 2016, he was promoted to the first team on Eccellenza. He left the club in June 2017.

On 22 July 2017, he moved to Ebolitana.

For the 2017–18 season, he joined to  Vibonese in Serie D.

On 27 January 2022, he signed with Fidelis Andria.

References

External links
 
 

1999 births
Living people
People from Nocera Inferiore
Footballers from Campania
Italian footballers
Association football fullbacks
Serie C players
Serie D players
Eccellenza players
A.S.D. Nocerina 1910 players
S.S. Ebolitana 1925 players
U.S. Vibonese Calcio players
S.S. Fidelis Andria 1928 players
Sportspeople from the Province of Salerno